Tena Petika (born 16 June 2000) is a Croatian handballer for RK Lokomotiva Zagreb and the Croatian national team.

She represented Croatia at the 2021 World Women's Handball Championship.

References

2000 births
Living people
Croatian female handball players
Sportspeople from Koprivnica
Competitors at the 2022 Mediterranean Games
Mediterranean Games silver medalists for Croatia
Mediterranean Games medalists in handball
RK Podravka Koprivnica players